Robbie the Reindeer is a series of three animated comedy television specials co-produced by the BBC and the charity Comic Relief which were broadcast on BBC One between Christmas 1999 and 2007. Although the series is distributed commercially by BBC Studios, and has been sold to more than 30 countries internationally, the entirety of the net profits from the series go to Comic Relief. The first two specials were animated in stop motion by the BBC Bristol animation unit, while the third was a CGI animation by Absolute Digital Pictures. Loosely based on Rudolph the Red-Nosed Reindeer by Robert L. May, Robbie the Reindeer was created by Richard Curtis, who also was executive producer of the first two specials and co-wrote Hooves of Fire.

The programmes follow Robbie, a reindeer who travels to the North Pole to follow in the footsteps of his father Rudolph and join Santa's sleigh team, his encounters with the vengeful Blitzen and his relationship with love interest Donner.

Characters
Robbie: The easy-going and childlike son of Rudolph whose nose acts as a tracking device. He is the captain of the sleigh team. Appears in all three films.
Prancer: An upbeat and slow-witted reindeer and a member of the sleigh team that befriends Robbie. Appears in all three films.
Donner: A support member of the sleigh team who is Robbie's best female friend, love interest and eventual wife. The name is a play on the British pronunciation of the feminine name 'Donna'. Reindeer, unlike other members of the deer family, have antlers in both sexes, so that both Donner and Vixen can be accurately portrayed as female. Appears in all three films.
Blitzen: The former captain of the sleigh team who is envious of Rudolph's popularity (so much so that he won't let anyone speak his name in his presence) and plots to "destroy" Robbie as revenge. Appears in Hooves of Fire and Legend of the Lost Tribe.
Old Jingle: The reindeer that trained Rudolph and prepares Robbie for The Reindeer Games.
Tapir: A reindeer who is a good friend of Robbie and a member of the sleigh team. Appears in all three films.
Des Yeti and Alan Snowman: Commentators for The Reindeer Games. The characters are parodies of presenter Des Lynam and football commentator Alan Hansen, who both starred on BBC One's Match of the Day in the 1990s. Appear  in Hooves of Fire and Legend of the Lost Tribe.
Vixen: An attractive, but apathetic female reindeer and a member of the sleigh team. She was Blitzen's girlfriend (until she ended their relationship at the end of Hooves of Fire) and Robbie's original love interest before falling in love with Donner. Appears in Hooves of Fire.
 Robbie's father: A legendary former sleigh team member who once "saved the day" for Santa and as a result is popular enough to have merchandise and a song named after him. He is unseen (apart from a painting of him in the sleigh team's home) and unnamed; a running gag sees any character who attempts to say his name immediately interrupted by Blitzen, who hates him. The character is implied to be Rudolph the Red-Nosed Reindeer, with the censorship of his name presumed to stem from trademark restrictions.

List of specials

Release

American dub
The programme was first shown in the United States on Fox Family with the original British voices until 2001. In 2002, CBS acquired the rights to the first two specials and recorded new dialog with American actors. The American cast included Ben Stiller (Robbie), Britney Spears (Donner), James Woods (Narrator, Viking 1), Brad Garrett (Prancer), Hugh Grant (Blitzen, largely imitating Coogan's original characterization), Leah Remini (Vixen, Koala), Jerry Stiller (Old Jingle), Dick Enberg (Des Yeti), Dan Dierdorf (Allan Snowman), Grey DeLisle (Mrs. Santa, Arctic Fox, Female Viking), Rob Paulsen (Head Elf, Viking 2/4) and Jim Belushi (Santa, Tapir, Little Magnus). Whereas the original British characters of Des Yeti and Alan Snowman originally parodied their counterparts on Match of the Day, the selection of Enberg and Dierdorf for the American dub parodied their work as a broadcast team for the NFL on CBS at the time. CBS stopped showing the program after the 2005 Christmas season, after which Nicktoons Network showed the original British version for two years. In 2016, CBS began broadcasting the first two specials again using the American dub. "Close Encounters of the Herd Kind" has not been dubbed nor made available in the United States.

In addition to the dub, the first two films have been shown as a single-hour long (45 minutes and advertisements) special on CBS since 2002, cutting around fifteen minutes of material from the original versions. One of the most obvious edits is the removal of the scene where Robbie actually discovers the Vikings in the first place. The edited and redubbed versions of "Hooves of Fire" and 'Legend of the Lost Tribe" premiered on CBS on December 13, 2002.

The uncut version of the dub is featured on the 2003 American DVD, with the original British version as an alternate audio track.

Home video
In the United Kingdom, Hooves of Fire was released on DVD on 27 November 2000. A "Collector's Edition" release adding Legend of the Lost Tribe followed on 24 November 2003 and a collection of all three specials, subtitled The Whole Herd, was released on 2 November 2009. The 2009 release contained the special features from previous releases, including a 5.1 sound mix on Hooves of Fire, directors' commentary on the first two specials, the complete Hooves storyboard, behind-the-scenes footage and an interview with Peter Peake. In the United States, Hooves of Fire was released on DVD on September 4, 2001, containing the British voice cast and the same extras as the UK release. A DVD adding Legend of the Lost Tribe was released on October 7, 2003, containing both the British and American dialogue tracks. This release also contained the extras from the UK edition, with the exception of the 5.1 mix and storyboards for Hooves of Fire.

References

External links

 Press pack from the BBC
 Robbie the Reindeer in Hooves of Fire  at Keyframe

1999 British television series debuts
2007 British television series debuts
Christmas television specials
BBC Television shows
Clay animation
Rudolph the Red-Nosed Reindeer
Comic Relief
Television series by BBC Studios